Amar Sejdić (born November 29, 1996) is an American professional soccer player who plays as a central midfielder for Major League Soccer club Atlanta United. Sejdić is of Bosnian descent. He played four years of college soccer for the Maryland Terrapins.

Career

Youth and college 
Sejdić was born in Berlin, Germany to Bosnian parents. His father hails from Jakeš near Modriča and his mother hails from Derventa. They fled Bosnia due to the Bosnian War and took refuge in Germany. At age four, Sejdić moved to the United States.

Sejdić began his youth career with the U-15 team for the Derby City Rovers in Louisville, Kentucky. After three years with the Rovers he moved abroad to play in the youth academy of Vitesse in the Dutch Eredivisie. Sejdić played a single season with the U-16 team of Vitesse before coming back to the United States to play with the U-17 and U-18 academy teams of Real Salt Lake. Upon graduating high school, Sejdić signed a National Letter of Intent to play college soccer at the University of Maryland, College Park.

Ahead of the 2015 NCAA Division I men's soccer season, Sejdić was ranked number 50 by TopDrawerSoccer.com in his graduating class and number 37 by College Soccer News in his graduating class. Of incoming first year students, he was ranked 10th by TopDrawer Soccer and during the year he became a regular rotation player, appearing in 15 matches for the Terrapins. Sejdić scored his first two college goals against St. John's on August 30, 2015. On September 27, 2015; Sejdić notched his first collegiate assist in a 4–1 win against Wisconsin.

During his second year he appeared in all matches for the Terrapins, where he contributed to nine goals and nine assists during the 2016 NCAA Division I men's soccer season. Two of Sejdić's nine goals came during the 2016 NCAA Division I Men's Soccer Tournament, in a 4–5 loss to Providence. During the 2017 season, Sejdić remained an integral part of the team and scored three goals and dished out four assists.

Sejdić had a breakout season during 2018, as he was named to the Big Ten best XI during the 2018 Big Ten Conference men's soccer season. Sejdić helped lead Maryland to their fourth College Cup title, earning offensive MVP honors.

Senior 
During the 2017 and 2018 PDL seasons, Sejdić played for Derby City Rovers.

On January 11, 2019, Sejdić was selected in the second round of the 2019 MLS SuperDraft with the 34th overall pick by Montreal Impact.

On 7 July 2021, Sejdić was traded to Atlanta United in exchange for $100,000 of General Allocation Money, with the potential for the fee to rise another $50,000.

Career statistics

Club

Honors
Montreal Impact
Canadian Championship: 2019

Notes

References

External links 
 Maryland Profile
 Amar Sejdić on Instagram
 Amar Sejdić on Twitter

1997 births
Living people
Footballers from Berlin
Soccer players from Louisville, Kentucky
German footballers
American soccer players
German people of Bosnia and Herzegovina descent
American people of Bosnia and Herzegovina descent
Association football midfielders
German emigrants to the United States
Derby City Rovers players
Expatriate soccer players in Canada
Maryland Terrapins men's soccer players
CF Montréal draft picks
USL League Two players
CF Montréal players
Major League Soccer players
Ottawa Fury FC players
USL Championship players
NCAA Division I Men's Soccer Tournament Most Outstanding Player winners
Atlanta United FC players